The 1941–42 Liga Bet season was the second tier league of the Palestine League organized by the EIFA. The league was split into two regional divisions: North and South. The North division was won by Maccabi Netanya, while Hapoel Rehovot won the South division.

At the end of the season, the two divisional winners met in a two-legged play-off to determine promotion to top division. Maccabi Netanya won the first match 3–1, and Hapoel Rehovot won the return leg 2–0. A deciding match was never played, as the EIFA decided to promote both teams to Liga Alef.

North division

South division

 Three teams, HaTehiya Tel Aviv, Beitar Ramat Gan and Mr. Burton XI competed in the league, but withdrew before completing the first half of the season. The teams' results were annulled. Egged Tel Aviv, Hapoel HaNoar HaOved and Mr. Barker XI withdrew during the second half of the season and the remainder of their fixtures were given as 0–3 losses.

References

Liga Bet seasons
Palestine
2